Adam is a town in the region Ad Dakhiliyah, in northeastern Oman.

History

The history of the Wilayat of Adam dates back to pre-Islamic times. Adam has several meanings in Arabic but most likely means the fertile land. The most notable places are Harrat Al Ain, Harrat al Bousaid, Harrat Al Hawashim, and Harrat Bani Shiban, where several archeological sites have been found, and Harr Al Jamii, which is more recent. It is the last green oasis before the desert. Here you can see ancient forts, citadels and towers, mosques and deserted traditional souqs. Adam is adjacent to Manah and Bahla to the north, Mahout and Haima in the Al Wusta region to the south, Wilayat Ibri of the Dhahirah region to the southwest and Wilayat at Mudhaibi of the Sharqiya region to the east. Its population numbers 13,000 in 60 villages.

Climate

See also 

 List of cities in Oman

Populated places in Oman
Ad Dakhiliyah Governorate